Sergey Nikolaevich Starostin (Russian: Сергей Николаевич Старостин; born 1 January 1956 in Moscow) is a Russian folk and jazz composer and performer, famous for his modern interpretations of archaic Russian (as well as Sámi and Tuvan) folk music. In his compositions, he sings, plays folk flutes (kalyuka overtone flute, svirel, pyzhatka), reed instruments (clarinet, zhaleyka, berben) and gusli.

In his early childhood, Starostin started to sing in a boys choir led by Vadim Sudakov. He started to play clarinet in school, and later graduated from Merzlyakov college of music, and then from the Moscow Conservatory. After graduation, he abandoned academic music for a while, completely switching to traditional folk instruments, tunes and non-tempered scales. By mid-90s, however, he started to collaborate with jazz musicians Mikhail Alperin and Arkady Shilkloper, forming a Moscow Art Trio group, and mixing together jazz and ethnic (Russian and Balkan) music. In his ethno-jazz compositions Starostin avoids harmonizations, staying within certain scales rather than sticking to chord patterns, which makes jazz played this way more "compatible" with traditional folk music. As of year 2011, however, Starostin is gradually moving from jazz and rock compositions back to more authentic folk traditional performance.

Works of Sergey Starostin are rooted in various folk traditions of nations inhabiting modern Russia. He participated in folk music research expeditions, and recorded several thousands tracks of authentic songs and instrumental compositions. In 1991 Starostin produced a series of TV programs called "World Village", and as of 2008 runs a different program named "Wanderings of a musician" at the Russian TV channel "Kultura". In 2006 he worked as a musical producer for the animated feature film "Prince Vladimir". Sergey Starostin also collects, and makes himself, traditional musical instruments; reads lectures, and gives master classes on history and theory of Russian traditional musical culture.

While many CDs and concert programs feature Starostin playing "Rozhok", it worth mentioning that actually he plays not the folk wooden trumpet, known as (Vladimirsky rozhok), but a "Tverskoy Rozhok", which is a reed instrument, also known as zhaleyka.

At different stages of his musical career Starostin also collaborated and recorded together with Mari Boine, Djivan Gasparyan, Angelite - The Bulgarian Voices, Volkovtrio, Sirin folk ensemble and others.

Selected discography
 Fly, Fly My Sadness (1996) - together with Angelite - The Bulgarian Voices, Huun-Huur-Tu and Mikhail Alperin
 XIX98 (1998) - with Mikhail Alperin, Arkady Shilkloper and Vladimir Volkov
 Prayer (1998) - with Mikhail Alperin and Arkady Shilkloper
 Much Better (1998) - with Volkovtrio, Arkady Shilkloper, Igor Butman, Kaigal-Ool Khovalyg and others
 Once There Was Sun (2000)
 Neath The Moon So Bright (2001) - with Vladimir Volkov and Svyatoslav Kurashov
 DOM concert (2007)
 Душеполезные Песни На Каждый День (2008) - with Andrey Kotov, Vladimir Volkov and Leonid Fedorov
 Хождение по Лукам (2009) - with Vladimir Volkov and Svyatoslav Kurashov

References

External links
 Profile on discogs.com

Living people
Russian musicians
World music musicians
Year of birth missing (living people)